The Rivière des Marsouins is a river on the Indian Ocean island of Réunion. It flows northeast from the center of the island, reaching the sea close to the town of Saint-Benoit. The Rivière des Roches follows a largely parallel course, reaching the sea three kilometres to the north.

References

Rivers of Réunion
Rivers of France